Sigmar may refer to:

 Sigmar (given name), a masculine given name
 Sigmar (Marvel Comics), a fictional character in the Marvel Comics universe
 Sigmar (Warhammer), a fictional deified emperor in the Warhammer Fantasy setting